The Moriah School is a  Modern Orthodox Jewish day school located in Englewood, New Jersey. It educates nearly 800 students from nursery through eighth grade.

As of the 2013-14 school year, the school had an enrollment of 692 students in grades K-8 (plus an additional 94 students in Pre-K for a total enrollment of 786) and 102 classroom teachers (on an FTE basis), for a student–teacher ratio of 6.7.

Notable alumni
 Tali Farhadian (born 1974/1975), former US federal prosecutor.
Kevie Feit, former mayor of Teaneck, New Jersey.
Yakir Forman, winner of the diaspora section of the 2007 International Bible Contest.
Eric Leiderman ('05), co-founder of Masorti on Campus, and winner of the Shoshana S. Cardin Leadership Award.
Joshua Prager, reporter and author.
 Rick Schwartz (born c. 1968), film producer.

רובו CUP Participation 
In March 2017, twelve eighth graders from the Moriah school competed in the first annual רובו CUP competition at Ben Porat Yosef. The students faced teams from Ben Porat Yosef and Yavneh Academy. Moriah students won first prize with their glove-controlled RC car to help paralysis victims.

References

External links 

Data for Moriah School of Englewood, National Center for Education Statistics

1964 establishments in New Jersey
Educational institutions established in 1964
Private elementary schools in New Jersey
Englewood, New Jersey
Jewish day schools in New Jersey
Private middle schools in New Jersey
Modern Orthodox Jewish day schools in the United States
Schools in Bergen County, New Jersey
Modern Orthodox Judaism in New Jersey